Barneveld Zuid  (English: Barneveld South) is a railway station in the south of Barneveld, Netherlands. The station opened on 2 February 2015 and is located on the Nijkerk–Ede-Wageningen railway, also known as the Valleilijn. The train services are operated by Connexxion.

Train services
, the following local train services call at this station:

Stoptrein: Amersfoort - Barneveld - Ede-Wageningen
Stoptrein: Amersfoort - Barneveld

References

External links

Dutch Public Transport journey planner

Zuid
Railway stations opened in 2015
2015 establishments in the Netherlands
Railway stations in the Netherlands opened in the 21st century